Somers Carroll Productions is an Australian television production company.

Somers Carroll was formed by Daryl Somers and Ernie Carroll, to produce Hey Hey It's Saturday, after original producer Gavin Disney left the series. Somers Carroll also produced compilation specials including The Best and Worst of Red Faces, Hey Hey By Request, The Plucka Duck Show, The Ossie Ostrich Video Show, Hey Hey it's the Comedians, The Russell Gilbert Show, Gonged but not Forgotten, and most recently the two Hey Hey Reunion specials broadcast in 2009 and a revived series of Hey Hey It's Saturday in 2010.
Somers Carroll have now started to relive the magic of Hey Hey by uploading countless hours of the program onto the Internet. All the shows from the reunion show in 2009 and the last full series in 2010 right through to footage from the archives dating back to the early days of the program when it was produced by GTV9.

Home video
Somers Carrol Productions also entered the DVD market, with releases of the Hey Hey by Request and Red Faces specials and under its record label 'Now Hear This' has released Daryl Somers's Album Songlines.

See also
 List of Australian television series

References

External links
 
 Official Website 
 Hey Hey it's Saturday at the National Film and Sound Archive

Television production companies of Australia